The 2009–10 OK Liga was the 41st season of the top-tier league of rink hockey in Spain.

Barcelona Sorli Discau finished the league as champion.

Competition format
Sixteen teams joined the league.

For this season, the playoffs were abolished and four teams would be relegated to Primera División with the aim of reducing the league to only 14 teams.

League table

Copa del Rey

The 2010 Copa del Rey was the 67th edition of the Spanish men's roller hockey cup. It was played in Lloret de Mar between the eight first qualified teams after the first half of the season.

Roncato Vic defended successfully its title and won its 3rd cup.

References

External links
Real Federación Española de Patinaje

OK Liga seasons
2010 in roller hockey
2009 in roller hockey
2010 in Spanish sport
2009 in Spanish sport